Once I Will Return or Dalmatian Wedding is a 1953 German-Yugoslav comedy film directed by Géza von Bolváry and starring Paul Dahlke, Helene Stanley, and Adelheid Seeck. A millionaire returns from the United States to his native Dubrovnik.

Cast
Paul Dahlke as John Rick
Helene Stanley as Gloria
Adelheid Seeck as Countess Stella Monti
Pero Alexander as Count Pero Monti
Elma Karlowa as Marina
Heinz Drache as Bob Emerson
Egon von Jordan as Mome
Iván Petrovich as Ruge
Vickie Henderson as stewardess Mary
Pat Chico as cook
Hans Hais as 1. creditor
Lojze Potokar as 2. creditor
Viktor Beck as fisherman Josip
Das Jugoslawische National-Ensemble Zagreb as Dancers

References

External links

1953 romantic comedy films
West German films
German romantic comedy films
Films directed by Géza von Bolváry
Films set in Dubrovnik
Films set in the Mediterranean Sea
Yugoslav romantic comedy films
1950s German films